The 1956 European Baseball Championship was held in Rome, Italy and was won by the Netherlands. Belgium finished as runner-up.

Standings

Results

References
(NL) European Championship Archive at honkbalsite
(NL) www.delpher.nl

European Baseball Championship
European Baseball Championship
1956
1956 in Italian sport